Isabel Estefanía de la Rubia Badante (born 27 August 1986), known artistically as Nya de la Rubia, is a Spanish singer and actress. She earned popularity for her performance in Mar de plástico.

Biography 
Isabel Estefanía de la Rubia Badante was born in Seville on 27 August 1986. Daughter of a copla singer (mother) and a flamenco guitarist (father), she was raised in the neighborhood of Triana. She began to write her own songs at age 16–17.

In the wake of taking acting training starting in 2005, she made her television acting debut in Andalusian regional soap opera Arrayán in 2007. She released an album in 2013. In addition to vocals, she plays piano, guitar and cajón. She and her single Callejuelos appeared in musical television series  (2014).

She landed a breakthrough role by playing civil guard agent Lola Requena in crime drama series Mar de plástico (2015–16), also composing the series' main theme "Ya no puedo más". She has since featured in series such as El Continental, La peste, Gigantes, Servir y proteger, and Mariachis. She also featured in a villain role in Kike Maíllo's action thriller film Toro (2016). She performed (and composed alongside Baby Noel) Perdóname, señors main theme "Perdóname". In 2022, she released an EP titled Raíces featuring a fusion of flamenco and urbano.

Filmography

Film

References 

Living people
1986 births
21st-century Spanish actresses
Spanish film actresses
Spanish television actresses
Singers from Andalusia
People from Seville
21st-century Spanish women singers
21st-century Spanish singers